Naomi Ruth Wray  is an Australian statistical geneticist at the University of Queensland, where she is a Professorial Research Fellow at the Institute for Molecular Bioscience and an Affiliate Professor in the Queensland Brain Institute. She is also a National Health and Medical Research Council (NHMRC) Principal Research Fellow and, along with Peter Visscher and Jian Yang, is one of the three executive team members of the NHMRC-funded Program in Complex Trait Genomics.

Education and career 
Wray has a B.Sc. from the University of Edinburgh (1984), and an M.S. from Cornell University in 1986. She earned her Ph.D. in 1989 from the University of Edinburgh where she worked on population genetics.

Selected publications

Awards and honors 
She was elected a fellow of the Australian Academy of Science in 2016 and of the Australian Academy of Health and Medical Sciences in 2020.

References

External links
Faculty page

Living people
Australian geneticists
Statistical geneticists
Alumni of the University of Edinburgh
Academic staff of the University of Queensland
Women geneticists
Australian women scientists
Fellows of the Australian Academy of Science
Cornell University alumni
Year of birth missing (living people)
Fellows of the Australian Academy of Health and Medical Sciences